1900 ("Twentieth Century") is a 1976 epic historical drama film directed by Bernardo Bertolucci and featuring an international ensemble cast including Robert De Niro, Gérard Depardieu, Dominique Sanda, Francesca Bertini, Laura Betti, Stefania Casini, Ellen Schwiers, Sterling Hayden, Alida Valli, Romolo Valli, Stefania Sandrelli, Donald Sutherland, and Burt Lancaster. Set in Bertolucci's ancestral region of Emilia, the film chronicles the lives and friendship of two men – the landowning Alfredo Berlinghieri (De Niro) and the peasant Olmo Dalcò (Depardieu) – as they witness and participate in the political conflicts between fascism and communism that took place in Italy in the first half of the 20th century. The film premiered out of competition at the 1976 Cannes Film Festival.

With a runtime of 317 minutes in its original version, 1900 is known for being one of the longest commercially released films ever made. Its great length led to its being presented in two parts when originally released in many countries, including Italy, East and West Germany, Denmark, Belgium, Norway, Sweden, Colombia, Pakistan and Japan. In other countries, such as the United States, a single edited-down version of the film was released. 1900 has become widely regarded as a cult classic, and has received several special edition home video releases from a variety of distributors. A restoration of the film premiered out of competition at the 74th Venice International Film Festival in 2017.

Plot

The film opens on 25 April 1945, the day Italy is liberated from the fascists. The peasants on an estate in Emilia-Romagna are shown attempting to join the partisans and place the owner of the estate, Alfredo Berlinghieri, under arrest. A middle-aged man named Attila and woman named Regina are seen attempting to flee the farm but are attacked by women labourers wielding pitchforks.

The narrative moves back to the start of the century. Both born on the day of the death of composer Giuseppe Verdi – 27 January 1901 – Alfredo Berlinghieri and Olmo Dalcò come from opposite ends of the social spectrum. Alfredo is from a family of wealthy landowners led by his popular grandfather (also called Alfredo or Alfredo the Elder) and grows up with his cousin Regina. Olmo is an illegitimate peasant born to an unmarried young woman who already has had several children. His grandfather, Leo, is the foreman and peasants' spokesman who carries out a duel of wits with the elder Alfredo which masks a deep-seated mutual respect. As Alfredo is somewhat rebellious and despises the falseness of his family, in particular his weak but abusive and cynical father Giovanni, he befriends Olmo, who has been raised as a socialist. During this time, Leo leads strikes against the unfair conditions on the farm.

The two are friends throughout their childhood, despite the social differences of their families, and spend much time in one another's company. Olmo enlists with the Italian army in 1917 during World War I and goes off to fight while Alfredo learns how to run his family's large plantation under the guidance of his father. Olmo returns from the war over a year later and his friendship with Alfredo continues. However, Giovanni, the padrone since the elder Alfredo's suicide, has hired Attila Mellanchini as his foreman. Taken with fascism in a similar way that Giovanni has been, Attila eventually incorporates his new belief system in his dealings with the Berlinghieri workers; he treats them cruelly, and wins Regina and Giovanni over to his side. In the 1920s, Olmo enters into a relationship with Anita, a down-to-earth woman who shares his enthusiasm for the cause of workers' rights. Together, Olmo and Anita lead several fervent protests against the landowners.

Following the death of Giovanni, Alfredo becomes the new padrone and marries Ada, a gorgeous, demure Frenchwoman. During the 1930s, he proves to be a weak padrone, repeatedly bending to the whim of the fascists. Ada sinks into alcoholism when confronted with the reality of the emptiness of her marriage to Alfredo; she sympathises to some extent with the workers and despises Alfredo for his failure to stand up to Attila.

Meanwhile, Olmo's wife Anita dies in childbirth, but manages to bring another member into the community; a daughter whom Olmo names after his late wife. Olmo's daughter, Anita the Younger, grows into a young and resourceful teenager who is supportive of her father's socialist beliefs. As Olmo takes on his fateful role of leader among the poor farmers and their families, he clashes several times with Attila. The latter, whose psychopathic tendencies have been revealed via the murders of a cat and a small boy (the latter at Alfredo and Ada's wedding and for which Olmo was initially blamed), commits further atrocities such as killing the elderly Mrs. Pioppi in order to steal her land and home. However, he becomes a fresh target of ridicule at the hands of the peasants; led by Olmo, they take turns throwing manure at him after Attila tries to sell Olmo like a slave. Olmo flees to keep from being killed by the fascists, and Attila reacts to the humiliation by tearing up Olmo's house with his blackshirts before caging the peasants on the Berlinghieri compound and indiscriminately shooting them. Alfredo fires Attila, but discovers that Ada has already left him.

The story comes full circle when the power shifts after World War II in 1945, and the ruling class is at the mercy of the jovial yet bitter farm labourers. Attila and Regina, having been apprehended, are imprisoned in the Berlinghieri pigsty, and the women peasants cut off Regina's hair. Attila gleefully confesses to the murders he has committed over the years and is executed on the spot. Olmo returns to the farm in time to see Alfredo being brought before a workers' tribunal to stand trial. Many workers come forth and accuse Alfredo of letting them suffer in squalor while he profited from their labours, although he did not support fascism. Alfredo is sentenced to death, but his execution is prevented after Olmo explains that the padrone is dead, so Alfredo Berlinghieri is alive, suggesting that the social system has been overthrown with the end of the war. As soon as the verdict is reached, however, representatives and soldiers of the new government, which represents the Communist Party, Christian Democrats, the Action Party, Liberals, and Socialists arrive and call on the peasants to turn in their arms. Olmo convinces the peasants to do so, overcoming their scepticism. Alone with Olmo, Alfredo declares "The padrone is alive", indicating the struggle between the working and ruling classes is destined to continue.

The film ends with Alfredo and Olmo playfully tackling each other as they did in their childhood, then the scene suddenly jumps forward several years to the present day with the elderly Alfredo and Olmo walking along a railway track. Alfredo lies down in the center of the tracks as his younger self would do as a game while a train would run over the tracks, but Alfredo would emerge unharmed as he would lie perfectly still. Alfredo appears to lay himself across the tracks as a train approaches in a clear attempt at suicide as if he has chosen to end his life at that time. The final shot shows the train traveling over the younger Alfredo lying perfectly still in the center of the tracks.

Cast

 Robert De Niro as Alfredo Berlinghieri
 Paolo Pavesi as young Alfredo
 Gérard Depardieu as Olmo Dalcò
 Roberto Maccanti as young Olmo
 Dominique Sanda as Ada Chiostri Polan
 Francesca Bertini as Sister Desolata
 Laura Betti as Regina
 Donald Sutherland as Attila Mellanchini
 Stefania Sandrelli as Anita Foschi
  as Ottavio Berlinghieri
 Stefania Casini as Neve
 Sterling Hayden as Leo Dalcò
  as Anita Dalcò, Olmo's daughter
 Ellen Schwiers as Amelia
 Alida Valli as Signora Pioppi
 Burt Lancaster as Alfredo the Elder
 Romolo Valli as Giovanni Berlinghieri
 Giacomo Rizzo as Rigoletto
 Pippo Campanini as Don Tarcisio
 Antonio Piovanelli as Turo Dalcò
 Paulo Branco as Orso Dalcò
 Liù Bosisio as Nella Dalcò
 Maria Monti as Rosina Dalcò
 Anna Maria Gherardi as Eleonora
 Demesio Lusardi as Montanaro
 Pietro Longari Ponzoni as Pioppi
 José Quaglio as Aranzini
 Clara Colosimo as Giovanna
 Vittorio Fanfoni as Fanfoni
 Edda Ferronao as Stella's Daughter

Dub voices (Italian version) 
 Ferruccio Amendola as Alfredo Berlinghieri
 Giuseppe Rinaldi as Alfredo the Elder
 Renato Mori as Leo Dalcò
 Claudio Volonté as Olmo Dalcò
 Antonio Guidi as Attila Mellanchini
 Rita Savagnone as Ada Chiostri Polan
 Riccardo Cucciolla as Ottavio Berlinghieri
 Paila Pavese as Amelia
 Rossella Izzo as Anita Dalcò, Olmo's daughter

Release
The original director's cut of the film runs 317 minutes (5 hours, 17 minutes) and was released in two parts in Italy. Alberto Grimaldi, the film's producer, was contractually obligated to deliver a 195-minute (3 hour, 15 minute) version to Paramount Pictures for release in the United States and Canada. Bertolucci originally wanted to release the film in two parts, but, on Grimaldi's refusal, 20th Century Fox picked up distribution in the United States, dropping out only when Bertolucci declined to shorten the film by 80 minutes.

Grimaldi then locked Bertolucci out of the editing room and assembled a 180-minute cut. Bertolucci, horrified at Grimaldi's cut, decided to compromise. His 247-minute (4 hour, 7 minute) version was the one initially released in the United States. In 1987, the Bravo channel broadcast the uncut version with English-dubbed dialogue. Later in 1991, the film was restored to its original length and shown in a limited release. The film has been shown uncut on Sky Movies and Film 4.

When Bertolucci released his 317-minute version to theaters, the Motion Picture Association of America re-classified the film with an NC-17 rating; the 245-minute American cut, the other version officially available on video in the United States, still retained its R rating. In 2006, Paramount surrendered the NC-17 rating of the uncut version, then released it as unrated on DVD on 5 December 2006. This same uncut version was released on Blu-ray Disc in the U.S. by Olive Films on 15 May 2012.

Reception
1900 won the 1977 Bodil Award for Best Non-American Film and received 2nd place in the National Society of Film Critics Award for Best Cinematography.

Paramount released the shorter version in America theatrically, and the version has received mixed reviews from American critics. On Rotten Tomatoes, the film holds a 57% rating based on 21 reviews, with a weighted average of 6.1/10.

In the Chicago Sun-Times, film critic Roger Ebert wrote that the film "doesn't seem to go anywhere. It's an epic only by virtue of its length."

Soundtrack

The music for the movie was composed by Ennio Morricone, who included several melodies from Verdi operas.

 "Romanzo" – 4:05
 "Estate – 1908" – 5:01
 "Autunno" – 4:43
 "Regalo di Nozze" – 2:45
 "Testamento" – 2:25
 "Polenta" – 1:07
 "Il Primo Sciopero" – 2:48
 "Padre e Figlia" – 1:27
 "Tema di Ada" – 4:50
 "Apertura Della Caccia" – 5:44
 "Verdi E Morto" – 2:30
 "I Nuovi Crociati" – 3:32
 "Il Quarto Stato" – 1:33
 "Inverno – 1935" – 2:45
 "Primavera – 1945" – 2:06
 "Olmo E Alfredo" – 2:18

See also

 "La Lega"
 List of longest films

References

Further reading

External links
 
 
 

1976 films
1970s historical romance films
1976 romantic drama films
Italian epic films
Italian historical romance films
Italian romantic drama films
West German films
1970s English-language films
1970s Italian-language films
Films directed by Bernardo Bertolucci
Films scored by Ennio Morricone
Films produced by Alberto Grimaldi
Films about animal cruelty
Films about communism
Films about fascists
Films about anti-fascism
Films about sexuality
Films set in Italy
Films set in Emilia-Romagna
Films set in the 1900s
Films set in the 1910s
Films set in the 1920s
Films set in the 1930s
Films set in the 1940s
Films shot in Italy
Films shot in Naples
Films shot in Rome
Paramount Pictures films
Italian multilingual films
French multilingual films
20th Century Fox films
United Artists films
Films released in separate parts
English-language French films
English-language German films
English-language Italian films
1976 multilingual films
1970s Italian films